Jiefang Road Subdistrict is a subdistrict in Yaodu District, Linfen, Shanxi, China. As of the 2010 Chinese Census, the subdistrict's population is 60,070.

Administrative divisions 
Jiefang Road Subdistrict administers the following six residential communities:

 Nanhui Community
 Pingyang Community
 Lüyuan Community
 Shifu Community
 Qufu Community
 Jinlong Community

Demographics 
The subdistrict's recorded population in the 2010 Chinese Census totaled 60,070, a substantial increase from the 36,673 recorded in the 2000 Chinese Census. This increase reflects the sizable population growth of the wider area, with Yaodu District's population growing by approximately 30% over the same span of time.

References 

Linfen
Township-level divisions of Shanxi